The Fabulous Udin is a 2016 Indonesian film directed by Herdanious Larobu as well as starred Ajil Ditto, Bella Graceva Amanda Putri, Aldy Rialdy Indrawan, Difa Ryansyah, Zulfa Maharani Putri, Raza Adhanzio, Musdalifah Basri, Lidya Kandou, Fandy Christian, and Ussy Sulistiawaty. The movie was adapted from a novel with same name by Rons Imawan.

Cast 
 Ajil Ditto as Udin
 Bella Graceva as Suri
 Aldy Rialdy Indrawan as Ucup
 Difa Ryansyah as Jeki
 Zulfa Maharani as Inong
 Raza Adhanzio as Sading
 Musdalifah Basri as Ainun
 Lydia Kandou as Udin's mother
 Fandy Christian as Cakka
 Ussy Sulistiawaty as Suri's mother

Special Performance 
 The Overtunes

Production
The Fabulous Udin was directed by Herdanius Larobu. The script was written by Cassandra Massardi. The producer of the film was Chand Parwez Servia of Starvision. The shooting began in the end of March 2016. The shooting was taken for about 15 days.

The story of the film was adapted from a novel of a same name by Rons Imawan.

Release
The Fabulous Udin was released on May 12, 2016.

Reception
A review from Republika stated that the main character, Udin, who is a middle-schooler is portrayed in the film too mature because of there are too much motivational phrases. The development process of the main character is also not clearly presented.

References

External links 
 
 
 Trailer OFFICIAL

Indonesian drama films
2016 films